The Palazzo Zevallos Stigliano is a Baroque palace located on Via Toledo number 185 in the quartiere San Ferdinando of central Naples, Italy. It is also called the Palazzo Zevallos or Palazzo Colonna di Stigliano, and since 2014 serves as a museum of artworks, mainly spanning the 17th through the early 20th centuries, sponsored by the Cultural Project of the bank Intesa Sanpaolo. This museum is linked to the Museum or Gallerie di Piazza Scala in Milan and the Museum at Palazzo Leoni Montanari in Vicenza, also owned by the Bank.

History
The palace was commissioned by Giovanni Zevallos, Duke of Ostuni. The palace was built between 1637 and 1639 after a design by Cosimo Fanzago. The palace was damaged during the 1646 Revolution of Masaniello, and in 1653 sold to the Flemish merchant Jan van den Eynde, at the time one of the richest men in Naples. Jan van den Eynde and his son Ferdinand wholly renovated the palace, with the help of the architect-friar Bonaventura Presti. 

Van den Eynde, who was also the owner of one of largest art collections in the Napoletano, filled the palace with a colossal collection of paintings, by artist such as Leonard Bramer, Giacinto Brandi, Jan van Boeckhorst, Jan Brueghel the Elder, Paul Bril, Viviano Codazzi, Aniello Falcone, Guercino, David de Haen, Pieter van Laer, Jan Miel, Cornelius van Poelenburch, Cornelis Schut, Goffredo Wals, Bartolomeo Passante, Mattia Preti, Pieter Paul Rubens, Carlo Saraceni, Massimo Stanzione, Van Dyck, Simon Vouet, Pieter de Witte and many others. Jan van den Eynde's granddaughter, Giovanna van den Eynde, daughter of the Marquess Ferdinand, married the Prince of Sonnino, Giuliano Colonna, who then inherited the palace in 1688. The palace still bears the Arms of unification of the Van den Eynde and Colonna over its gate.

Over the decades following the end of the 19th century, the palace was acquired by the Banca Commerciale Italiana, and reconstruction was pursued under architect Luigi Platania. The facade acquired its present look, and a monumental marble staircase was installed, which is surrounded by 19th century frescoes by Giuseppe Cammarano and Gennaro Maldarelli. The frescoes include Cammarano's Apotheosis of Sappho (1832). The courtyard was made into a stunning covered public hall vaulted by a glass ceiling with a floral motifs. The palace became a public museum and gallery. In 2001 Banca Intesa, became the Intesa Sanpaolo.

Collections
Among the works contained in the gallery are:
The Martyrdom of Saint Ursula by Caravaggio, thought to be his final work
Judith and Holofernes, attributed to Louis Finson, which may be a copy of a Caravaggio original
Holy Family with St Francis of Assisi, by Angelo Caroselli
Christ and the Adulturess by Bernardo Cavallino
San Giorgio by Francesco Guarini
Adoration by the Magi attributed to Master of the Annunciation to the Shepherds
Tobias heals his father's blindness by Hendrick de Somer
Two still-life canvases by Paolo Porpora
Still life with bread, fruit, game, and fish by Giovan Battista Ruoppolo
Two still lifes by Giuseppe Recco
Still-lifes with Vases of Flowers (1715) by Baldassare De Caro  
Hagar and Ishmael in Desert with Angel by Francesco Solimena 
The secret letter and The Concert by Gaspare Traversi
Four Veduta of Naples  including Largo di Palazzo and il borgo di Chiaia da Pizzofalcone (1729) by Gaspare van der Wittel (Vanvitelli)
Landscape by Anton Sminck Pitloo
Four water color landscapes by Giacinto Gigante
Landscape with laghetto by Nicola Palizzi
La terrazza di Domenico Morelli by  Achille Carrillo
Isabella Orsini duchessa di Bracciano (1844) by Francesco Domenico Guerrazzi
Landscapes by Federico Rossano  
Landscapes by Marco De Gregorio
Landscape by Giuseppe De Nittis
Landscapes by Gioacchino Toma
Landscape by Giuseppe Fabozzi
Landscape by Francesco Mancini 
Portrait of painter Vincenzo Migliaro by Gaetano Esposito 
Two self-portraits by Francesco Paolo Michetti
Woman with fan by Domenico Morelli
Two capricci of antique monuments by Vincenzo Abbati and Domenico Battaglia
Work by Paolo Vetri
Urban vedute by Carlo Brancaccio, Francesco Mancini, Francesco Paolo Diodati and Vincenzo Migliaro 
Frescoes of Faith by Giuseppe Cammarano and Gennaro Maldarelli
Portraits of Mariano Fortuny and Domenico Morelli, by Vincenzo Gemito 
Kidnapping of Helen and Immaculate Conception by Luca Giordano
Christ Blessing by Francesco Di Maria
Four allegories of Faith (ovals, 1759) by Francesco De Mura from Sala delle Udienze of the Palazzo Monte di Pieta, Naples

References

 
Zevallos
Baroque architecture in Naples
Zevallos
Zevallos
Intesa Sanpaolo buildings and structures
Private art collections
1639 establishments in Italy
Buildings and structures completed in 1639